Flodaigh is an islet in outer Loch Ròg, Lewis, Scotland. It lies north west of Great Bernera and Little Bernera, south of Bearasaigh and Seanna Chnoc and west of Campaigh.

There are various islets and skerries surrounding the island including Fleisgeir, Sgeir an Saoidhean and the tidal Tamna.

There is no regular access to the island although boat excursions are available locally.

Notes

References
 

Islands of Loch Ròg